Lawrence After Arabia is a 2016 play by the British playwright Howard Brenton, centred on T. E. Lawrence and his 1922 retreat from public life at the home of his friends George Bernard Shaw and his wife Charlotte. Its premiere production ran from 28 April to 4 June 2016 at the Hampstead Theatre in London to mark the centenary of the outbreak of the Arab Revolt, in which Lawrence played a leading part.

Cast
 T.E. Lawrence - Jack Laskey
 George Bernard Shaw - Jeff Rawle
 Charlotte Shaw - Geraldine James
 Lowell Thomas - Sam Alexander
 Prince Feisal - Khalid Laith
 Edmund Allenby - William Chubb
 Blanche Patch - Rosalind March 
Mohammed Abdullah -  Kai Spellman.

Critical reception
The Independent found it "intriguing, richly researched but underpowered"; while The Daily Telegraph noted "A quiet, but highly topical, masterpiece...clever and engaging...the skill of the play is that it doesn’t make you think; it lets you think"; and The Times found it "Fascinating...it feels as if we have been given a magic window to see what really happened to Lawrence after Arabia."

References

External links
 Lawrence After Arabia - Hampstead Theatre

2016 plays
English plays
Plays set in the 1920s
Plays set in the 1930s
Plays set in England
Biographical plays about military leaders
Biographical plays about writers
Cultural depictions of T. E. Lawrence
Cultural depictions of George Bernard Shaw
Fiction set in 1922